La razón de vivir (English: The reason for living) is a Mexican telenovela produced by Ernesto Alonso for Telesistema Mexicano in 1966.

Cast 
Carmen Montejo
Aldo Monti
Daniel Riolobos
Oscar Morelli
Yolanda Ciani
Carmen Salinas

References

External links 

Mexican telenovelas
1966 telenovelas
Televisa telenovelas
Spanish-language telenovelas
1966 Mexican television series debuts
1966 Mexican television series endings